Steve Cardenas is a guitarist who began his career in Kansas City, Missouri and has been part of the New York City jazz community since 1995.

Career
Cardenas was a member of the Paul Motian Electric Bebop Band, Charlie Haden Liberation Music Orchestra, Steve Swallow Quintet, and Joey Baron's band, Killer Joey. He is currently a member of the Ben Allison Band, John Patitucci Electric Guitar Quartet, Jon Cowherd Mercy Project and Adam Nussbaum Lead Belly Project. Cardenas has also worked with Claude "Fiddler" Williams, Paul McCandless, Madeleine Peyroux, Norah Jones, Eliane Elias and Marc Johnson. He has toured throughout Europe, North and South America and Asia, performing at international music festivals, theaters, and clubs. Cardenas has released seven recordings as a leader.

Cardenas is on faculty at The New School for Jazz and Contemporary Music in New York City. He has been on the faculty at the California Institute of the Arts, Segunda Residencia Antonio Sánchez, Siena Summer Jazz Workshop, Stanford Jazz Workshop, Banff International Workshop in Jazz and Creative Music, and Brubeck Summer Jazz Colony. Cardenas is co-author, with editor Don Sickler, of the Thelonious Monk Fakebook, released by Hal Leonard Publishing.

Discography

As leader
 Healing Power - The Music of Carla Bley (Sunnyside, 2022)
 Blue Has a Range (Sunnyside, 2020)
 Charlie & Paul (Newvelle, 2018)
 Melody in a Dream (Sunnyside, 2014)
 West of Middle (Sunnyside, 2010)
 Panoramic (Fresh Sound, 2004)
 Shebang (Fresh Sound, 2000)

As sideman
With Ben Allison
 Moments Inside (Sonic Camera, 2021)
 Layers of the City (Sonic Camera, 2017)
 Quiet Revolution (Newvelle, 2016 / Sonic Camera, 2018)
 The Stars Look Very Different Today (Sonic Camera, 2013)
 Action-Refraction (Palmetto, 2011)
 Think Free (Palmetto, 2009)
 Little Things Run the World (Palmetto, 2007)
 Cowboy Justice (Palmetto, 2006)

With Jeff Beal
 Contemplations (Triloka, 1994
 Three Graces (Triloka, 1993)
 Objects in the Mirror (Triloka, 1990))

With Paul Motian
 Garden of Eden (ECM, 2006)
 Holiday for Strings (Winter & Winter, 2002)
 Europe (Winter & Winter, 2001)
 Monk & Powell (Winter & Winter, 1999)

With others
 Steve Million, What I Meant To Say (Origin, 2021)
 Adam Nussbaum, Lead Belly Reimagined (Sunnyside, 2020)
 Kandace Springs, The Women Who Raised Me (Blue Note, 2020)
 Ted Nash, Somewhere Else (Plastic Sax, 2019)
 Adam Nussbaum, The Lead Belly Project (Sunnyside, 2018)
 Jon Cowherd, Gateway (Newvelle, 2017)
 Bria Skonberg, With a Twist (Sony/Okeh 2017)
 Adam Kolker, Beckon (Sunnyside, 2017)
 Charlie Haden Liberation Music Orchestra, Time/Life (Impulse!, 2016)
 Chris Cheek, Saturday Songs (Sunnyside, 2016)
 John Patitucci, Brooklyn (Three Faces, 2015)
 Jim Campilongo, Dream Dictionary (Blue Hen, 2014)
 Eliane Elias, I Thought About You (Concord Jazz, 2013)
 Steve Swallow, Into the Woodwork (XtraWATT, 2013)
 Anthony Wilson, Seasons: Live at the Metropolitan Museum of Art (Goat Hill, 2012)
 Monika Borzym, Girl Talk (Sony, 2011)
 Roseanna Vitro, The Music of Randy Newman (Motema, 2011)
 Adam Cruz, Milestone (Sunnyside, 2011)
 Jim Campilongo, Orange (Blue Hen, 2009)
 Mike Holober & The Gotham Jazz Orchestra, Quake (Sunnyside, 2008)
 Chris Potter, Song for Anyone (Sunnyside, 2007)
 Donny McCaslin, Give and Go (Criss Cross, 2006)
 Charlie Haden Liberation Music Orchestra, Not in Our Name (Verve, 2005)
 Dave's True Story, Simple Twist of Fate (BePop, 2005)
 Kate McGarry, Mercy Streets (Palmetto, 2005)
 Rebecca Martin, People Behave Like Ballads (Maxjazz, 2004)
 Alexis Cuadrado, Visual (Fresh Sound, 2004)
 John Zorn, Voices in the Wilderness (Tzadik, 2003)
 Mike Fahn, Close Your Eyes and Listen (Sparky, 2002)
 Kate McGarry, Show Me (Palmetto, 2002)
 Rebecca Martin, Middlehope (Fresh Sound, 2001)
 Alexis Cuadrado, Metro (Fresh Sound, 2001)
 Mark Isham, Miles Remembered (Columbia, 1999)
 Steve Million, Truth Is (Palmetto, 1998)
 Joel Harrison, 3+3=7 (Nine Winds, 1996)
 Tom Coster, From The Street (JVC, 1995)
 Brandon Fields, A Coffeehouse Christmas (Positive Music, 1994)
 Paul Hanson, The Last Romantics (Midi Inc, 1993)
 Paul McCandless, Premonition (Windham Hill, 1992)
 Gary Foster, Kansas City Connection (Revelation)

References

External links
 Official site

Living people
1959 births
20th-century American guitarists
American jazz guitarists